Pavel Kašpařík (born January 11, 1979 in Písek, Czechoslovakia) is a former Czech professional ice hockey player who played 16 seasons in the Czech Extraliga. He was selected by the Philadelphia Flyers in the 7th round (200th overall) of the 1999 NHL Entry Draft.

Playing career
Kašpařík has spent his whole career with many teams, starting at the local team IHC Písek in Czech First League, then HC Sparta Praha in Czech Extraliga. He played for HC Liberec in 2003–2004, then back in Sparta Prague for 2 seasons, before playing with HC Hamé Zlín in 2006–2007, then he has been playing again in Liberec for 2007–2009.

In 1999, Kašpařík was #200 in the draft (round seven), picked by Philadelphia Flyers, however he did not play in the NHL.

References

External links

Pavel Kašpařík on the official HC Liberec website

1979 births
BK Mladá Boleslav players
HC Bílí Tygři Liberec players
HC Havířov players
HC Karlovy Vary players
HC Plzeň players
HC Sparta Praha players
PSG Berani Zlín players
IHC Písek players
Living people
Motor České Budějovice players
Sportspeople from Písek
Philadelphia Flyers draft picks
Czech ice hockey forwards